Arent Mikal Henriksen (born 8 September 1946 in Sørfold) is a Norwegian politician who represented the Socialist Left Party (SV), later the Norwegian Labour Party. He was a member of the Parliament of Norway from 1973 to 1977 and from 1981 to 1989, representing Sør-Trøndelag. He was mayor of Bjugn from 1995 to 1999.

References

1946 births
Living people
People from Sørfold
Socialist Left Party (Norway) politicians
Labour Party (Norway) politicians
Members of the Storting
Sør-Trøndelag politicians
20th-century Norwegian politicians